Thorn Castle is a children's fantasy novel by Australian author Ian Irvine.  It is the first of The Sorcerer's Tower series. The Sorcerer's Tower was a finalist for the 2008 Aurealis Award for best children's (8–12 years) illustrated work/picture book.

Thorn Castle has been reviewed by The Courier Mail and Reading Time.

Plot summary
Tamly is the only person in Meadowhythe who cannot do magic. He wishes he knew why, and longs to learn magic. But it is precisely his lack of magic which makes him ideal for the dangerous challenge of rescuing the Book of Spells from the evil sorcerer Lord Harshax. Together with his magically gifted friend Kym, he sets out to steal the book and save his village.

References

2008 Australian novels
2008 children's books
Australian fantasy novels
Australian children's novels
Children's fantasy novels
Novels by Ian Irvine
Omnibus Books books